Benzoxonium chloride (Absonal) is an antiseptic and disinfectant.

References

External links

Antiseptics
Quaternary ammonium compounds
Chlorides
Benzyl compounds